The 1881 Columbian University football team was an American football team that represented Columbian University (now known as George Washington University) as an independent during the 1881 college football season. It was the first season in school history.

Schedule

References

Columbian University
George Washington Colonials football seasons
College football undefeated seasons
Columbian University football